Amirovo (Ämir) is a rural locality (a selo) in Khalikeyevsky Selsoviet, Sterlibashevsky District, Bashkortostan, Russia. The population was 483 as of 2010. There are 4 streets.

Geography 
Amirovo is located 13 km south of Sterlibashevo (the district's administrative centre) by road. Akchishma is the nearest rural locality.

References 

Rural localities in Sterlibashevsky District